Camilla Huse (born 31 August 1979) is a Norwegian former footballer. She made her debut on the Norway women's national football team in 2005.

In the 2007 FIFA Women's World Cup in China, Huse played in all of the Norwegian team's matches — the team finished in fourth place behind USA, Brazil and Germany.

Huse played with the club Kolbotn, which won the Norwegian league  in 2002, 2005 and 2006.  She announced her retirement at the end of 2007 and missed most of the 2008 season through pregnancy, but then joined the League and Cup champion club Røa IL at the beginning of 2009.  She was with the Norway team at the UEFA Women's Euro 2009 played in Finland between Europe's top twelve footballing nations.

Huse is the mother of two girls and works as a teacher.

References

External links
 
 
  
  

1979 births
Living people
Norwegian women's footballers
Norway women's international footballers
Toppserien players
Kolbotn Fotball players
Athene Moss players
Røa IL players
Vålerenga Fotball Damer players
Women's association football defenders
Norwegian schoolteachers
2007 FIFA Women's World Cup players